Mark Andrew Kiefer (born November 13, 1968) is a former Major League Baseball pitcher. He played in parts of four seasons in the majors, from  until , for the Milwaukee Brewers. He pitched a total of 44 games, all in relief. He also played for four years in the Chinese Professional Baseball League for the Sinon Bulls and three years in the KBO League for the Kia Tigers and the Doosan Bears.

A native of Fullerton, California, Kiefer attended Garden Grove High School and Fullerton College. In 1987, he played collegiate summer baseball with the Chatham A's of the Cape Cod Baseball League. He was selected by the Brewers in the 21st round of the 1987 MLB Draft.

Kiefer's brother, Steve Kiefer, also played in the major leagues as an infielder.

References

External links

Career statistics and player information from Korea Baseball Organization

American expatriate baseball players in South Korea
American expatriate baseball players in Taiwan
Major League Baseball pitchers
Milwaukee Brewers players
Sinon Bulls players
Kia Tigers players
Doosan Bears players
Helena Brewers players
Beloit Brewers players
Arizona League Brewers players
Fullerton Hornets baseball players
Stockton Ports players
El Paso Diablos players
Denver Bears players
New Orleans Zephyrs players
Omaha Royals players
Las Vegas 51s players
Chatham Anglers players
KBO League pitchers
Baseball players from California
1968 births
Living people